Sagaria is an extinct genus of flowering plant in the Ranunculaceae (the buttercup family) which existed in southern Italy during the Albian age. The type species is Sagaria cilentana.

Taxonomy

The genus was erected based on a single specimen (part and counterpart) retrieved from an exposure in the Alburni mountains near Petina, in the Campania region. The locality was already known for both crustacean and plant fossils. The name is dedicated to the collector of the specimen, Giovanni Sagaria.

References

Ranunculaceae
Early Cretaceous plants
Fossil taxa described in 2010
Cretaceous angiosperms
Prehistoric angiosperm genera